Mickey's Magical Christmas: Snowed in at the House of Mouse is a 2001 direct-to-video Christmas comedy fantasy crossover animated film produced by Walt Disney Television Animation, with the animation production being done at Toon City Animation in Manila, Philippines. It is the first of two direct-to-video films spin off from the Disney Channel animated television series House of Mouse — the other being Mickey's House of Villains. The events of the film take place during the second season of Disney's House of Mouse.

The film includes two Disney short films — 1952's Pluto's Christmas Tree and 1983's Mickey's Christmas Carol — as well as three 1999 episodes of Mickey Mouse Works (albeit one of them only as a shortened skit). It received mixed reviews.

Plot
After a successful Christmas Eve show, Mickey wishes the guests a safe trip home. However, Goofy points out that they and the guests cannot leave the House of Mouse as a snowstorm has blocked up all the exits. The guests are worried, but Mickey decides to hold a free-of-charge Christmas party for them until the storm lets up. Unfortunately, Donald is not feeling the Christmas spirit. So Mickey and Minnie play different Christmas cartoons to get him in the spirit.

The cartoons they show include Donald trying to ice-skate and constantly destroying snowmen Huey, Dewey and Louie are building in a competition, Pluto trying to get Chip and Dale out of Mickey's Christmas tree, the Mickey version of The Nutcracker, along with Ludwig Von Drake's "The Science of Santa", Mickey decorating his house in blinding lights that can be seen outside of town, and interviews about what everyone wants for Christmas or feels grateful for.

After all this, everyone, including villains like Jafar, is happy that everyone is enjoying Christmas. However, Donald still refuses to change his mood, promptly souring the crowd's mood. Upset that everything he tried did not lift Donald's Christmas spirit, Mickey heads to the roof, where he tells Jiminy Cricket that all he wanted was for his friend to be happy and enjoy Christmas; Jiminy advises him to wish upon a star. Mickey does so and the star falls into his hands. Mickey returns to Donald, whom he offers the honor of putting the star on the tree. Donald does so, instantly becoming jolly. The star magically begins redecorating the club, turning the wreaths golden and giving the Magic Mirror a Santa hat, while turning Sorcerer Yen Sid's sorcerer's hat into a Santa hat and turning Jafar's staff into a candy cane. Various languages saying Merry Christmas appear on the television as Mickey announces one last cartoon before a carol.

After Mickey's Christmas Carol, everyone gathers on the stage, singing "The Best Christmas of All". Mickey wishes everyone a Merry Christmas as Tinker Bell ends the film.

Voice cast

 Wayne Allwine as Mickey Mouse
 Russi Taylor as Minnie Mouse
 Tony Anselmo as Donald Duck and Huey, Dewey, and Louie
 Tress MacNeille as Daisy Duck, Chip 'n' Dale
 Bill Farmer as Goofy, Pluto, and Practical Pig
 Carlos Alazraqui as Panchito
 Jeff Bennett as Lumiere
 Jodi Benson as Ariel
 Robby Benson as Beast
 Corey Burton as Ludwig Von Drake, Gus, Grumpy and Mad Hatter
 Eddie Carroll as Jiminy Cricket
 Pat Carroll as Ursula
 John Cleese as the Narrator (The Nutcracker segment)
 Peter Cullen as Eeyore
 Jonathan Freeman as Jafar
 Jennifer Hale as Cinderella
 J.P. Manoux as Kuzco
 Mark Moseley as Mushu
 Paige O'Hara as Belle
 Rob Paulsen as Jaq
 Ernie Sabella as Pumbaa
 Kevin Schon as Timon
 Michael Welch as Pinocchio
 April Winchell as Mother Von Drake
 Rick Logan as Aladdin / Chorus
 Bobbi Page as Jasmine / Chorus
 Blayne Weaver as Peter Pan
 Patricia Parris as Daisy Duck (Mickey's Christmas Carol segment)
 Alan Young as Scrooge McDuck (Mickey's Christmas Carol segment) 
 Will Ryan as Pete, Willie the Giant (Mickey's Christmas Carol segment)

Cartoons
(shown in sequential order)
 Donald On Ice (1999)
 Pluto's Christmas Tree (1952)
 The Nutcracker (1999)
 Mickey's Christmas Carol (1983)

In addition, certain pieces of animation in the House segments are recycled from the series' episodes "Clarabelle's Christmas List", "Pete's Christmas Caper", "House of Turkey" and "Mickey vs. Shelby". Also, clips from the Mickey Mouse Works''' short Mickey's Christmas Chaos'' are played at one point.

See also 
 List of Christmas films

References

External links
 

2001 animated films
2001 films
2001 direct-to-video films
American Christmas films
Disney direct-to-video animated films
Donald Duck films
Mickey Mouse films
American children's animated comedy films
American computer-animated films
Animated films based on animated series
Animated Christmas films
Animated crossover films
American children's animated fantasy films
Films scored by Michael Tavera
2000s American animated films
2000s Christmas films
Disney Television Animation films
2001 directorial debut films
2000s children's animated films
Scrooge McDuck
Films directed by Bobs Gannaway
Films directed by Tony Craig (director)
2000s English-language films
2000s fantasy films
2001 fantasy films
2000s fantasy comedy films